In neuroscience, homeostatic plasticity refers to the capacity of neurons to regulate their own excitability relative to network activity. The term homeostatic plasticity derives from two opposing concepts: 'homeostatic' (a product of the Greek words for 'same' and 'state' or 'condition') and plasticity (or 'change'), thus homeostatic plasticity means "staying the same through change".

Comparison with Hebbian plasticity 

Homeostatic synaptic plasticity is a means of maintaining the synaptic basis for learning, respiration, and locomotion, in contrast to the Hebbian plasticity associated with learning and memory. Although Hebbian forms of plasticity, such as long-term potentiation and long-term depression occur rapidly, homeostatic plasticity (which relies on protein synthesis) can take hours or days. TNF-α  and microRNAs are important mediators of homeostatic synaptic plasticity.

Homeostatic plasticity is thought to balance Hebbian plasticity by modulating the activity of the synapse or the properties of ion channels. Homeostatic plasticity in neocortical circuits has been studied in depth by Gina G. Turrigiano and Sacha Nelson of Brandeis University, who first observed compensatory changes in excitatory postsynaptic currents (mEPSCs) after chronic activity manipulations.

Mechanism 

Synaptic scaling has been proposed as a potential mechanism of homeostatic plasticity. Homeostatic plasticity can be used to describe a process that maintains the stability of neuronal functions through a coordinated plasticity among subcellular compartments, such as the synapses versus the neurons and the cell bodies versus the axons. Recently, it was proposed that homeostatic synaptic scaling may play a role in establishing the specificity of an associative memory. 

Homeostatic plasticity also maintains neuronal excitability in a real-time manner through the coordinated plasticity of threshold and refractory period at voltage-gated sodium channels.

Role in central pattern generators 

Homeostatic plasticity is also very important in the context of central pattern generators. In this context, neuronal properties are modulated in response to environmental changes in order to maintain an appropriate neural output.

References

External links 
 

Neuroplasticity